Charles Edward "Dusty" Decker (October 19, 1911 – October 11, 1962) was an American baseball shortstop in the Negro leagues. He played with the Indianapolis ABCs and Montgomery Grey Sox in 1932 and the Detroit Stars.

Early life and career
Charles Edward Decker was born on October 19, 1911, in Hopkinsville, Kentucky, the oldest of two sons born to Edward Decker and Inez Caldwell. Approximately one month later, the family moved to Evansville, Indiana.

Decker graduated from Frederick Douglass High School before briefly attending Fisk University in 1928. The following two years, he majored in physical education at Lincoln University while winning All-Midwestern honors as quarterback for the Blue Tigers, acquiring an alternate nickname, "The Human Catapult", in the process.

References

Further reading
 Courier-Journal staff (April 10, 1938). "Decker Is Signed to Manage Black Colonels". The Louisville Courier-Journal. p. 58
 Clipper staff (February 20, 1947). "Racial discrimination by Hotels is 'Detrimental'". Garrett Clipper. p. 4
 United Press (February 24, 1953). "Evansville Man to Head State FEPC". Logansport Pharos-Tribune. p. 8
 Herald staff (October 22, 1954). "GOP Rally Held; Adams Township Event Planned". Anderson Herald. p. 1
 "Art Teacher Says Letter Writer 'Is Guilty of Mass Denunciation". The Lincoln Clarion. April 20, 1956. p. 2
 News staff (January 7, 1959). "FEPC Letter Banned for Little Rock Stories". The Indianapolis News. p. 34
 Palladium-Item staff (March 6, 1959). "Fair Employment Ordinance Proposal Expected to Come from Local Negroes". Richmond Palladium-Item. p. 2
 Associated Press (May 8, 1959). "Discrimination in Hiring Negro Officials Reported". Richmond Palladium-Item. p. 12
 News staff (February 5, 1960). "Intergroup Relations Prospects Reviewed". The Indianapolis News. p. 30

External links
 Decker, Charles Edward at Notable Kentucky African Americans Database
 and Seamheads

Detroit Stars (1937) players
Indianapolis ABCs (1931–1933) players
Montgomery Grey Sox players
Lincoln Blue Tigers football players
African-American players of American football
African-American baseball players
African Americans in Indiana
Politicians from Evansville, Indiana
Fisk University alumni
1911 births
1962 deaths
Baseball players from Kentucky
Baseball shortstops
20th-century African-American sportspeople
African-American state legislators in Indiana